The 1906–07 Isthmian League season was the second in the history of the Isthmian League, an English football competition.

Ilford won the title. At the end of the season Casuals, Civil Service and Ealing Association resigned from the league.

League table

References

External links
Official website

Isthmian League seasons
1906–07 in English association football leagues